Aasif Sheikh (born 11 November 1964) is an Indian film, stage, and television artist. He played the role of Prince Ajay Singh in Hum Log. He has appeared in numerous Bollywood films and TV serials. He acted in the TV series Yes Boss which ran from 1999 to 2009 and sitcom Bhabiji Ghar Par Hain!.

He has been acknowledged by World Book of Records London for performing more than three hundred characters in a single running television show - Bhabiji Ghar Par Hain! a Hindi sitcom on 19 October 2021.

Personal life
Sheikh was born on 11 November 1964 in New Delhi, India. He attended Saint Anthony's School. He spent his childhood school breaks in Varanasi, Uttar Pradesh. He then initially enrolled in Khalsa College, Delhi for a Bachelor of Arts degree in English Honours, then turned to Hotel Management, but soon dropped to pursue theatre. He married Zeba Sheikh in 1989, with whom he has two children, daughter, Maryam Nastasia, born 1990, and son, Alyjah Iman, born 1995.

Theatre
He is associated with Indian People's Theatre Association(IPTA), Mumbai. He has acted in plays like Kabuliwala, Aakhri Shama, Simla Coffee House, Hum Deewane Hum Parwane, Ek Baar Phir and Aaall izz Well with Shuturmurgh Ek Baar Phir, Oye Ki Gal Hain, Pyaar Mein Kabhi Kabhi. One of his popular plays is U-Turn co-starring Poonam Dhillon.

Filmography

Feature films

Television

Web series

Awards

See also
 List of Indian television actors
List of Bollywood actors

References

External links 
 
 

1964 births
Living people
People from Varanasi